Winsome Andante (April 6, 1993 - September 25, 2019) an English imported crossbred eventer (84.5% Thoroughbred, 9.5% Arabian, and 6% Irish) who has competed successfully to the highest levels of the sport of eventing. His rider, Kimberly Severson, has taken him to many well-known events, and he has won the Rolex CCI**** a record three times. He has also competed at the Burghley Horse Trials, as well as in the Olympics and the World Equestrian Games.

"Dan" was strong in all three phases. He usually won or placed among the top horses in the dressage, followed by a fast, clean cross-country run and a good show jumping round.

In November 2006, Dan rose to the top of the USEA Leader Board, ahead of retired Giltedge, with a total of 1,184 career points.

Dan was retired in November 2007 due to a hind limb lameness.

Top Placings
 Winner of the 2001 Blenheim Horse Trials
 Winner of the 2002 Rolex Kentucky CCI****
 Winner of Over the Walls Horse Trials in 2002
 Individual 6th place and Team Gold at the World Equestrian Games in Jerez, Spain
 Winner of the 2004 Rolex Kentucky CCI****
 Winner of the individual silver and team bronze medal at the Athens Olympics in 2004
 Winner of the 2005 Rolex Kentucky CCI****
 Member of the US Eventing Team at the 2006 World Equestrian Games in Aachen (team finished in fourth place)
 Top of the USEA Leader Board (as of 2006)
 3rd at the 2007 Badminton Horse Trials CCI****

Eventing horses
Horses in the Olympics
1993 animal births